Nesta Carter OD (born October 11, 1985) is a retired Jamaican sprinter who specialized in the 100 metres event. Carter was successful as part of the Jamaican 4 x 100 metres relay team, taking gold and setting successive world records at the 2011 World Championships and 2012 London Olympics. He also won a 4 x 100m silver medal at the 2007 World Championship and a gold at the 2015 World Championships. On August 11, 2013, Carter secured an individual 100m World Championship bronze medal in Moscow, behind Justin Gatlin and teammate Usain Bolt. He followed this with another gold in the 4 x 100 metres relay.

In August 2010 he became only the fifth sprinter to run the 100 metres in less than 9.8 seconds. His 100m personal best of 9.78 currently ranks him as the ninth fastest man of all time, behind fellow Jamaicans Usain Bolt, Yohan Blake and Asafa Powell, Americans Tyson Gay, Justin Gatlin, Christian Coleman and Trayvon Bromell, and Kenyan Ferdinand Omurwa.

On 25 January 2017, the International Olympic Committee sanctioned Carter for doping at the 2008 Olympic Games, meaning that Carter and his teammates lost their gold medals for the men's 4 × 100 m relay. On 31 August 2021 Carter officially announced his retirement.

Career
Carter attended Manchester High School in central Jamaica. He is a member of the MVP (a Jamaican track and field club. MVP stands for Maximising Velocity and Power).

2002
Representing his high school at the ISSA Championships Carter finished second in the Class 2 100 m in 11.58 s (wind −1.3 m/s), and fourth in the 200 m in 22.54 (wind −2.0 m/s). The 4 × 100 m relay team did not finish their heat.

2003
Carter's 11.01 was thirteenth fastest in the semi-finals of the Class 1 100 m at the ISSA Championships and he did not advance to the final. He finished seventh in the 200 m final, in 22.01 s. His school did not field a team for the 4 × 100 m relay.

2004
In April he finished third in the CARIFTA Games Under 20 200 m, in 21.10 (wind −1.4 m/s), and won gold with the Jamaican 4 × 100 m relay team in 39.48 s. Carter finished fourth in the 200 m at the June CAC Junior Championships, his time 21.35 s, and ran the third leg of the 4 × 100 m relay team which finished first in 40.63 s. He finished fourth in the 200 m semi-final at the July World Junior Championships in 21.24 s. In the semi-final of the 4 × 100 m relay Carter ran the third leg and the team qualified for the final in 39.90 s. The Jamaica team finished second in the final without Carter.

2005
At the ISSA Championships Carter finished second in the Class 1 100 m in 10.59 s, and second in the 200 m in 21.00 s. No relay team was fielded by his school.

2006
At the Jamaica International Invitational Carter won the 100 m B race in 10.41 s.

2007
In May Carter finished joint-third at the Jamaica International Invitational meet and won the Grande Premio Brasil Caixa de Atletismo in 10.20 s, his first win of an IAAF Grand Prix event.

At the Osaka World Championships Carter won his heat in 10.17 s, finished fourth in the quarter-final in 10.23 and finished seventh in the semi-final of the 100 m, his time 10.28 s. Carter ran the third leg of the 4 × 100 m relay team which finished second in a new national record of 37.89 s.

2008
At the inaugural UTech Track and Field Classic Carter ran a personal best 20.38 in the 200 m, bettering his previous best by 0.40 s.

Carter was named UTech Sportsman of the Year 2007/2008 on April 10.

Carter ran the third leg of the 4 × 100 m relay at the Penn Relays, the team winning the USA vs The World event in 39.14 s.

On May 25 Carter successfully defended his title at the Grande Premio Brasil Caixa de Atletismo, winning in 10.19 s. One week later he won the 100 m at DKB-ISTAF in a personal best 10.08, his first win at a Golden League event.

Carter did not report for the start of the 100 m final at the National Trials, due to a leg cramp. He made the Jamaican team for the Olympics after running a personal best 20.31 in the final of the 200 m.

At the July DN Galan in Stockholm Carter won race two in 9.98 s, a new personal best that made him just the fifth Jamaican under the 10 second barrier.

At the 2008 Olympics in Beijing he ran the third leg of the 4 x 100 metres relay semi-final with Michael Frater, Dwight Thomas and Asafa Powell. Their time of 38.31 s ranked second of sixteen nations in the first round. Thomas was replaced by Usain Bolt for the final, Carter ran the first leg and the team set a new world record of 37.10 s, claiming the gold medal. The split time for Carter's lead-off leg of the relay was 10.34 (USATF High Performance registered split analysis). In 2017 Carter was found guilty of using performance-enhancing drugs, resulting in him and the rest of the Jamaican team being stripped of the gold medals.

Carter equaled his personal best of 9.98 when he finished third at Athletissima 2008 in Lausanne. The race was won by Asafa Powell in a new personal best of 9.72 s.

At the Zagreb 2008 event Carter won in 10.23 s. Four days later Carter finished second in the 100 m at the World Athletics final in 10.07 s.

Carter was honoured in a homecoming celebration and received an Order of Distinction (Officer Rank) in recognition
of his achievements at the Olympics.

2009
Carter ran on the MVP 4 x 100 m relay team at the Milo Western Relays held at the GC Foster College on February 14. The team recorded a new meet record and world leading time of 38.72 s.

Carter was nominated for the Laureus World Team of the Year award on April 16, as a member of the 2008 Jamaica Olympic sprint team. Two days later Carter ran a leg of the 4 × 100 m at the UTech Track and Field Classic at the National Stadium in Kingston, Jamaica. The winning time of 38.46 was a new meet record. Carter also finished third in the 200 m at the event in 20.69.

Carter next competed at the Penn Relays on April 25, in the 4 × 100 m relay. Asafa Powell on the fourth leg pulled up and finished ninth in 41.24. A report in the Jamaica Observer on the morning of the event indicated that Powell had injured his ankle in training and was not expected to run. On May 8 he finished seventh in 10.34 with a reported calf cramp at the Qatar Athletic Super Grand Prix.

At the Reebok Grand Prix in New York, Carter finished a disappointing ninth in 10.16 s. His entry was withdrawn from the Prefontaine Classic on the day of the event. A week before the National Championships on June 26 the Jamaica Amateur Athletic Association confirmed that no entry had been received for Carter. The president of MVP track club cited an injury.

He also won the scholarship for the prestigious Harvard Law School along with his first cousin Kevoy O. K. Carter, a student of the University of the West Indies.

2010
In 2010 Carter made some huge improvements in the 100 m races that he had run in the year, by lowering his PB in the 100 m from 9.91 to 9.78—ran in Rieti, Italy on August 29—which equalled the fastest time of 2010 over 100 m set by Tyson Gay a few weeks earlier in the year. The time also ranks Carter as the 5th fastest of all time, while still being the fourth fastest in Jamaica, behind Asafa Powell (9.72), Yohan Blake (9.69) and Usain Bolt (9.58).

2011
Carter managed to make the 100m at the 2011 World Athletics Championships with Michael Frater, Yohan Blake and defending champion Usain Bolt. Carter, Blake and Bolt all made it to the final, though Carter had reportedly injured his leg just after the semi-final. In one of the most controversial finals, Usain Bolt false started and was immediately disqualified from the race under the IAAF's new false start policy. Yohan Blake won the gold in 9.92, with Walter Dix in second in 10.08, and Kim Collins in third in 10.09. Carter trailed in last (7th, due to Bolt's elimination) in 10.95. However, he managed to recover for his injury in time for the 4 × 100 m relay. Jamaica retained their world title in 37.04 seconds, a new world record and the first sub-37.10 by a relay team.

2012
As part of the Jamaican 4 × 100 metres relay team, setting the world record and Olympic record on August 11, 2012, at the 2012 London Olympics, of 36.84 seconds. This makes him part of the only 4 x 100 metres relay team so far to have gone under 37 seconds.

2013
In 2013, Carter participated at the Madrid Invitational, breaking the meeting record at 9.87, also being his season best. At the Moscow World Championships, Carter won the bronze medal in the 100m in 9.95, behind American Justin Gatlin (9.85) and Jamaican teammate Usain Bolt (9.77). He won a third world championship relay gold, leading off the Jamaican relay team, made up of Carter, Kemar Bailey-Cole, Nickel Ashmeade and Bolt. The team won in 37.36 seconds. This win was Jamaica's fifth consecutive major championship sprint relay gold, winning the Olympics in Beijing 2008 and London 2012, and the world titles in Berlin 2009, Daegu 2011 and Moscow 2013.

2014
Carter confirmed interest in the World Indoor Championships in Sopot pending team selection.

2015
Carter went to the new season with a slow start. His season best was 9.98, behind American Ryan Bailey and teammate Asafa Powell. At the 2015 Bahamas World Relays, Nesta Carter ran the first leg at the 4 × 100 m relay, with exactly the same team that ran at the 2013 World Championships, which ended second behind USA relay team that consisted of Michael Rodgers, Justin Gatlin, Tyson Gay and Ryan Bailey. At the 2015 IAAF World Championships, the Jamaican team went on to the finals of the 4x100 meter relay, that consisted of Carter, Asafa Powell, Nickel Ashmeade and Usain Bolt, which ended with another gold medal with 37.37. This was Carter's fourth world title with the Jamaican team.

2016 – failed anti-doping test
Carter failed an anti-doping test for the banned stimulant methylhexanamine when traces of the drug were found in Carter's A and B samples. This happened when 454 frozen blood and urine samples from the 2008 Summer Olympics in Beijing were retested by the International Olympic Committee.

As a result, on 25 January 2017, Jamaica team lost their gold from the 4 x 100 metres and thus resulting in Trinidad & Tobago being the new gold medalists from the 2008 Summer Olympics. Carter appealed, but an international sports tribunal upheld a ruling against him.

Accomplishments and major competition results

Personal bests

Competition record

Time progression in the 100 m
All information taken from World Athletics profile

Time progression in the 200 m

References

External links

1985 births
Living people
Jamaican male sprinters
People from Manchester Parish
Athletes (track and field) at the 2008 Summer Olympics
Athletes (track and field) at the 2012 Summer Olympics
Medalists at the 2012 Summer Olympics
Olympic athletes of Jamaica
Olympic gold medalists for Jamaica
Olympic gold medalists in athletics (track and field)
World Athletics Championships athletes for Jamaica
World Athletics Championships medalists
World Athletics Indoor Championships medalists
Competitors stripped of Summer Olympics medals
Doping cases in athletics
Jamaican sportspeople in doping cases
Officers of the Order of Distinction
World Athletics record holders (relay)
Central American and Caribbean Games gold medalists for Jamaica
Competitors at the 2018 Central American and Caribbean Games
IAAF Continental Cup winners
World Athletics Championships winners
Central American and Caribbean Games medalists in athletics